...bez półPRĄDU...halfPLUGGED... is a live album of Polish progressive rock group Quidam, released 2006. It was recorded at Teatr Miejski, Inowrocław, 29 May 2006.

Track listing

Personnel 

 Zbyszek Florek – keyboards, backing vocals
 Maciek Meller – acoustic guitars, backing vocals
 Bartek Kossowicz – vocals, tambourine
 Mariusz Ziółkowski – bass guitar, acoustic guitar
 Maciek Wróblewski – drums, percussion
 Jacek Zasada – flutes, bass guitar

References

Quidam (band) live albums
2006 live albums